Gate: Scena III is the third studio album from Japanese singer Hitomi Shimatani. It was released on August 8, 2003, and hit #2 on the Oricon charts. Since then, it was last recorded as having sold around 194,000 copies.

Track listing
 Overture: Perseus ペルセウス (Perseusu)
 太陽のワナ (Tayou no Wana, lit. The Sun's Trap)
 C'est la vie!
 トラキアの女 (Torakia no Onna, lit. Thracian Woman)
 赤い砂漠の伝説 (Gate version) (akai sabaku no densetsu, lit. Legend of the Red Desert)
 Harvest Moon
 ミラージュ: Boy, I Am a Girl (Mirage)
 Bella Flor
 Take Me Home
 元気を出して (Genki wo Dashite, lit. Cheer Up)
 月影のエデンへ (Tsukikage no Eden E, lit. To a Moonlit Eden)
 J.U.M.P.
 いつの日にか・・・ (Gate version) (itsu no hi ni ka..., lit. Someday)
 Perseus: ペルセウス (Heavens Wire VS. Tri-Hedge RMX）(Perseusu)

Hitomi Shimatani albums
2003 albums